Tegan and Sara are a Canadian indie pop duo formed in 1998 in Calgary, Alberta. The band is led by identical twin sisters Tegan Rain Quin and Sara Keirsten Quin (born September 19, 1980). Both musicians are songwriters and multi-instrumentalists.

The duo has released 10 studio albums. They earned a Grammy nomination in 2012 for their video album Get Along. Their most recent album, Crybaby, was released on October 21, 2022. Tegan and Sara's memoir High School was released on September 24, 2019. The TV series of the same name based on the memoir was released on Amazon Freevee in the fall of 2022.

History

1995–2002: Background and early work 

Tegan and Sara began writing songs at 15 years old using an old guitar they found in their basement. One of the first songs they wrote was "Tegan Didn't Go To School Today," which was written by Sara and recorded by the pair to cassette tape. The band was first called "Plunk", which was short for "light punk" due to their lack of a drummer and bassist. In 1997, they used their school's recording studio to record two demo albums: Who's in Your Band? and Play Day. In 1998, they won Calgary's "Garage Warz" competition, which awarded them studio time. Using this studio time, they recorded their first professional demo called Yellow tape under the name "Sara and Tegan". This was followed by Orange tape and Red tape. In May 1998, they opened for Hayden in Calgary, marking their first major show.

In 1999, they released their debut album Under Feet Like Ours as "Sara and Tegan", with producer Jared Kuemper. Two songs from Red tape and two songs from Orange tape appeared on the album. They later changed their name to "Tegan and Sara" because people regularly misheard "Sara and Tegan" as "Sara Antegan". They signed with Neil Young's Vapor Records and released This Business of Art through the label in 2000.

2002–2011: Mainstream success 
In 2002, Tegan and Sara released their third album, If It Was You. Their fourth album, So Jealous, was released in 2004 and led to wider success and attention, both locally and internationally. This album was released through both Vapor and Sanctuary. The band's 2007 album, The Con, was released by Vapor and Sire, because Sanctuary chose to no longer release new music in the United States. The album was co-produced by Chris Walla. Guests and collaborators on the album included Jason McGerr of Death Cab for Cutie, Matt Sharp of The Rentals (and previously Weezer), Hunter Burgan of AFI and Kaki King.

On October 26, 2009, Tegan and Sara released their sixth album, Sainthood, which was produced by Chris Walla and Howard Redekopp. The duo also put out a three-volume book set titled ON, IN, AT that included stories, essays, journals and photos of the band touring America in late 2008, writing together in New Orleans and touring Australia. The photographs in the book were taken by Lindsey Byrnes and Ryan Russell. Sainthood debuted on the Billboard 200 chart at number 21, selling 24,000 copies in its first week. While recording the album, Tegan and Sara spent a week writing songs together in New Orleans. The song "Paperback Head" was the only song written by the pair to appear on the album, making it the first song on any Tegan and Sara album that they wrote together. Spin gave Sainthood four out of five stars and wrote "Tegan and Sara's music may no longer be the stuff of teens, but its strength remains in how much it feels like two people talking."

In 2011, they launched "2011: A Merch Odyssey", which saw at least one new item in the official online stores every month for the entire year. A live CD/DVD combination package titled Get Along was released on November 15 and contains three films titled "States", "India" and "For the Most Part". It was nominated for Best Long Form Music Video at the 2013 Grammy Awards.

2012–2018: Heartthrob, Love You to Death and The Con X: Covers 
Tegan and Sara began recording their seventh studio album, Heartthrob, on February 20, 2012. Eight songs were produced by Greg Kurstin. Joey Waronker contributed drums to these songs. Two songs were produced by Mike Elizondo, with Victor Indrizzo contributing drums, Josh Lopez contributing guitar and Dave Palmer contributing piano. The last two songs were produced by Justin Meldal-Johnsen. The first single, "Closer", was released on September 25, 2012. The album was released on January 29, 2013, and debuted on the Billboard top 200 at number 3, the band's highest-charting record to date, selling 49,000 copies in its first week. Heartthrob debuted at number 2 on the Canadian chart and digital downloads chart and hit number 1 on the rock and alternative album charts. In July 2013, the album was shortlisted for the 2013 Polaris Music Prize. In March 2014, Tegan and Sara won three Juno Awards for Single of the Year, Pop Album of the Year and Group of the Year.

Tegan and Sara finished their eighth studio album on November 30, 2015. On March 10, 2016, the band announced via their Facebook account that the album's title would be Love You to Death, with the release date set for June 3 of that year. They released the album's lead single "Boyfriend" on April 8. On April 25, tour dates were announced for their 2016 global tour in support of the album. The duo released a music video for each track on the album.

To commemorate the tenth anniversary of the release of their album The Con, Tegan and Sara collaborated with 17 artists including Cyndi Lauper to create The Con X: Covers in 2017. The participating artists recorded covers of The Cons original songs to benefit the Tegan and Sara Foundation. Tegan and Sara also toured an acoustic version of The Con in 2017 with a portion of the proceeds supporting the Tegan and Sara Foundation.

2019–2020: Hey, I'm Just Like You and memoir 
In May 2018 at Out Web Fest, Tegan stated they were working on a book, podcast and new record. Their memoir High School was released on September 24, 2019, by MCD Books, a division of Farrar, Straus and Giroux, alongside Simon & Schuster Canada and Virago Press in the United Kingdom. The memoir details their teenage years, growing up in Canada and "worshipping" Nirvana, Green Day and the Smashing Pumpkins. The book also details the twins' exploration of their sexuality. While researching the book, Tegan and Sara found cassettes of some of their earliest songs.

In early 2019, Tegan and Sara announced they were working on their next record for release later that year. On July 9, 2019, they announced via Instagram that their ninth album would be called Hey, I'm Just Like You and would consist of 12 re-recorded songs they initially wrote as teenagers. It was released on September 27, 2019, three days after the release of their memoir.

In April 2020, the duo created a live "show" called Where Does the Good Grow to entertain their fans during the COVID-19 pandemic, with merchandise designed by EE Storey. The show was held every Thursday at 3 p.m. PST on their Instagram account until the series finale on July 23, 2020.

In 2021 it was announced that a TV show named High School based on their memoir of the same name would be filmed in Calgary and directed by Clea DuVall. Two twins, Railey and Seazynn Gilliland, were cast as the main characters. The show was filmed from April to June 2022 and was released on Amazon Freevee in fall 2022.

2021–present: Still Jealous, new record label and Crybaby 
In July 2021, Tegan and Sara announced a return to the studio to work on their 10th studio album. On February 1, 2022, they announced Still Jealous, a completely acoustic re-imagining of So Jealous. Still Jealous was released on February 11, 2022.

In April 2022 the duo announced they had left Warner Bros. Records and signed a new record deal with Mom & Pop. They also released the first single "Fucking Up What Matters" from their 10th studio album on April 28, 2022. On July 12, 2022, they unveiled the album title, Crybaby, and that it would be released on October 21, 2022. The second single, "Yellow", was released on the same day, with the music video released on YouTube. The twins also announced their first tour in three years, which started in Philadelphia, PA on October 26, 2022, and ended in Vancouver on November 20, 2022.

Influences
Tegan and Sara have credited Green Day, Nirvana and Hole for "truly start[ing] to cement our desire to write and make our own music". During their teenage years, the duo were influenced by Hayden, the Smashing Pumpkins, Violent Femmes, Dinosaur Jr. and Teenage Fanclub. Other artists who have influenced Tegan and Sara include Depeche Mode, Rihanna, Taylor Swift, Madonna, Kate Bush, David Bowie, Mike Elizondo, Pink, Lily Allen, Erasure, Ace of Base, Tom Petty, Britney Spears, Katy Perry, Ani DiFranco, the New Pornographers, Cyndi Lauper, Sinéad O'Connor, Against Me! and Bruce Springsteen.

Personal lives
Both twins are openly gay, and both are married. In August 2022, Sara welcomed her first child.

At the age of 19, both Quins moved from their hometown of Calgary to Vancouver. In 2003, Sara moved to Montreal.

For many years, Tegan lived in both Vancouver, B.C. and Los Angeles, while Sara lived in Montreal and New York City.

As of 2019, both Tegan and Sara had moved back to live in Vancouver, BC.

Tegan and Sara are active politically and socially engaged. They are both advocates of LGBTQ equality as well as for music education, literacy and cancer research.

The sisters are cousins to musician Jen Twynn Payne, drummer and lead vocalist for the Vancouver-based band The Courtneys.

Activism and involvement in the LGBT community
In December 2016, and in the wake of the United States' presidential election, the sisters founded the Tegan and Sara Foundation to advocate for "economic justice, health and representation for LGBTQ girls and women". They have since partnered with Kiehl's to release Ultra Facial cleansers with limited-edition packaging in order to raise funds for the foundation. Profits from The Con X: Covers and a portion of ticket prices from The Cons 10th anniversary tour went to the Tegan and Sara Foundation. At the end of The Con 10th anniversary tour in 2017, they stated they plan to take two years off from touring to focus on the Tegan and Sara Foundation and to make a new record.

In 2013, the band partnered with Coolhaus, their "favourite ice cream sandwich truck", to create an ice cream sandwich in favour of same-sex marriage. The sandwich featured "double chocolate" cookies and salted caramel ice cream and was named "Til Death Do Us Part".

In 2012, they appeared on the cover of Under the Radar magazine's "Protest" issue. Both were photographed holding a sign that read: "The rights of the minority should never be subject to the whim of the majority." Also in Canada, they were actively supporting Quebec students in their protest against that provincial government. In the U.S., both were vocal during California's Prop 8 debates. On November 10, 2016, rather than boycotting North Carolina for HB2, Tegan and Sara performed at The Orange Peel and donated their proceeds to Equality North Carolina in order to fight the legislation. This inspired the band Matt and Kim to match their donation in the form of merchandise proceeds.

Due to the expansion of their audience, Tegan and Sara have gained a higher profile in the LGBTQ community. They were awarded Outstanding Music Artist at the GLAAD Media Awards, beating out high-profile musicians including Lady Gaga and Elton John. In June 2014, Tegan and Sara joined WorldPride to perform in the closing ceremonies at Yonge–Dundas Square in downtown Toronto.

The duo partnered with Revel & Riot to create a T-shirt that would fund Revel & Riot's mission for LGBTQ rights. The "Animals" T-shirt features Tegan and Sara, a turtle, fox, koala, penguin and a dragonfly all labeled with their Latin names. The text at the bottom reads "Gay behaviour is found in over 1500 species. LGBTQ equality now." All proceeds of the sale go to benefit the work of Revel & Riot.

Touring

Tegan and Sara began touring after graduating from high school in 1998, traveling both by car and Greyhound bus. In 2000, they toured with Neil Young and the Pretenders. Other notable touring mates include Ryan Adams, Weezer, Bryan Adams, Jack Johnson, the Black Keys, Ben Folds, Gogol Bordello, Cake, City and Colour, Death Cab for Cutie, Hot Hot Heat, the Killers, New Found Glory, Paramore, Rufus Wainwright, Eugene Francis Jnr, the Jezabels, An Horse, Steel Train, Holly Miranda and Speak.

The sisters are known to engage in onstage banter, which often includes stories and commentary about their childhood, politics and life on the road. This has become a characteristic trait of their live shows.

They have performed at festivals including the Mariposa Folk Festival 2001; Sarah McLachlan's Lilith Fair 1999, 2010; Coachella 2005, 2008, 2013; Lollapalooza; SXSW 2005, 2013; Austin City Limits; Bonnaroo; Falls Festival: Sasquatch! 2010; Osheaga; Cyndi Lauper's True Colors Tour 2008; Southbound 2009; Glastonbury 2010; Australia's Groovin' the Moo 2010, 2013; Splendour in the Grass 2016; Winnipeg Folk Festival 2011; Newport Folk Festival 2011; saskTel Saskatchewan Jazz Festival 2011; Cisco Ottawa Bluesfest 2011, 2015; Outside Lands 2014; Firefly 2014 and Area506 in 2017 in Saint John, New Brunswick. They performed at the ending ceremony at Toronto World Pride 2014 and at Boston Calling in May 2014.

In 2013, Tegan and Sara opened for the band fun. on their Most Nights Summer Tour which started in Toronto, Ontario on July 6 and ended in Bridgeport, Connecticut on September 28.

In January 2014, Katy Perry announced that Tegan and Sara, along with Capital Cities and Kacey Musgraves, would be the opening acts for the North American leg of her Prismatic World Tour. Tegan and Sara toured with Perry from September to October 2014.

On February 25, 2014, Tegan and Sara announced their Let's Make Things Physical Tour. The tour included a range of supporting acts for different cities, including Lucius, the Courtneys, Waters and My Midnight Heart. The tour kicked off on May 6 in Columbia, Missouri, and ended in November 2014.

In July 2014, the pair opened for Lady Gaga's 2014 concert tour, ArtRave: The Artpop Ball Tour, in Quebec City in front of a crowd of 80,000 people.

Their 2016 tour for Love You to Death started in London and passed through Australia, Hong Kong, Singapore and Taiwan in July before looping back to Canada and the United States.

Tegan and Sara were a part of the WayHome summer 2017 lineup in Oro-Medonte, Ontario.

Collaborations and other work
In 2009, Tegan and Sara worked as producers for the first time. Tegan worked with char2d2 on the 2009 Small Vampires EP, while Sara worked on the 2010 debut albums for Fences and Hesta Prynn.

Tegan
Tegan appeared on Against Me!'s song "Borne of the FM Waves of the Heart", and also appeared in the music video. She also sang backing vocals on Rachael Cantu's "Saturday" from her Run All Night.

In April 2008, Tegan wrote and recorded a song titled "His Love" at the request of Augusten Burroughs as a contribution to the audio version of his book A Wolf at the Table. The two headlined Spin's September 2008 Liner Notes benefit for Housing Works, a New York non-profit. Tegan sang with Jim Ward on his track "Broken Songs" and on the song "Contrails" by rapper Astronautalis, which appeared on his 2011 album This Is Our Science. She also appeared in the music video. Tegan was also featured in one of the songs off of Dan Mangan's new LP Unmake, titled "Forgetery Redux". In 2017, Tegan was featured on Ria Mae's song "Broken".

Sara
Sara sings on the Reason's song "We're So Beyond This" and also appears in the music video. She was featured on rapper/songwriter/producer Theophilus London's track "Why Even Try" from his 2011 Lovers Holiday EP. Sara appears on Jonathan Coulton's 2011 album Artificial Heart, providing vocals for the album's remake of the song "Still Alive", which Coulton wrote for Valve's game Portal. Sara covered Alicia Keys' "Try Sleeping with a Broken Heart" from Doveman's Burgundy Stain Sessions in 2011. In Kaki King's music video for "Pull Me Out Alive", Sara can be seen as well. Sara sang back-up vocals on two songs from former Smashing Pumpkins member James Iha's 2012 album Look to the Sky: "To Who Knows Where" and "Dream Tonight".

Together
In December 2010, Tegan and Sara collaborated with the Yellow Bird Project to produce a charity T-shirt. The shirt was designed by EE Storey with all profits benefiting FIERCE NYC, an organization that builds the leadership and power of LGBTQ communities in New York City.

Tegan and Sara have both ventured into songwriting for other artists. This includes two songs "A Hot Minute" and "The Worst" featured in Lisa Loeb's 2013 release No Fairy Tale. Sara also co-wrote "Sweetie", which was included in the deluxe edition of Carly Rae Jepsen's album Kiss.

They both feature on the single "Getaway," for VINCINT's debut album There Will Be Tears.

Other appearances
Their songs have been featured in the films Dallas Buyers Club, The Lego Movie, G.B.F., Monster-in-Law, Sweet November, These Girls and The Carmilla Movie and in the television shows Degrassi: The Next Generation, 90210, Being Erica, Ghost Whisperer, Grey's Anatomy, The Hills, Hollyoaks, jPod, The L Word, Life Unexpected, Melrose Place, One Tree Hill, Parenthood, Rookie Blue, The Vampire Diaries, Veronica Mars, Waterloo Road, What's New, Scooby-Doo?, Awkward, Riverdale, Girls and BoJack Horseman. Their song "Closer" was covered by Glee on the episode "Feud", which aired March 14, 2013. The song is also used in the teaser trailer for the 2013 independent comedy film, Exes. The songs "Closer" and "Back in Your Head" were featured in the 2016 video game LOUD on Planet X.

In 2011, Sara was a panelist on the CBC Radio One program Canada Reads, defending Jeff Lemire's graphic novel Essex County. The book, the first graphic novel to be featured as part of Canada Reads, was voted off after the first round but then later placed first in a "People's Choice" poll, collecting more votes than all of the other books combined.

In early 2014, Tegan and Sara collaborated with The Lonely Island on a song called "Everything Is Awesome!!!" for The Lego Movie soundtrack. The movie opened in theatres on February 7, 2014. The song debuted at number 62 on the Billboard Hot 100 chart and number 24 on the Official UK Singles Chart. It received an Oscar nomination for Best Original Song at the 87th Annual Academy Awards. In 2016, the twins had a short appearance on the show Take My Wife starring Cameron Esposito and River Butcher through a special YouTube-released holiday segment.

In September 2017, Tegan appeared as a guest on Esposito's podcast Queery. In October 2017, Sara was a guest on the show. In October 2019, both sisters appeared together on the podcast.

In 2020, their song "Make You Mine This Season" was featured in the film Happiest Season, starring Kristen Stewart and Mackenzie Davis. The film was directed by Clea DuVall, a friend of the duo.

Filmography

Film

Television

Band members
 Tegan Quin – vocals, guitar, keyboards
 Sara Quin – vocals, guitar, keyboards

Backing musicians 
 Adam Christgau – drums (2013–2014, 2022)
 Isaac Bolivar – guitar, keyboards (2022)

Former backing musicians
 Aaron Burke – drums (1998–1999)
 Marc Tremblay – bass (1998–1999)
 Chris Carlson – bass (2002–2006)
 Rob Chursinoff – drums (2002–2006)
 Ted Gowans – guitar, keyboards (2004–2014)
 Johnny Andrews – drums (2005–2010)
Dan Kelly – bass (2007)
 Shaun Huberts – bass (2007–2010)
Jason McGerr – drums (2012)
 Jasper Leak – bass, keyboard bass (2012–2014)
 John Spence – keyboards (2012–2014)
 Eva Gardner – bass (2016)
Brendan Buckley – drums (2016–2017)
Vivi Rama – bass (2017)
Gabrial McNair – keyboards (2016–2017)
Tim Mislock – guitar (2017)

Timeline

Discography

 Under Feet Like Ours (1999)
 This Business of Art (2000)
 If It Was You (2002)
 So Jealous (2004)
 The Con (2007)
 Sainthood (2009)
 Heartthrob (2013)
 Love You to Death (2016)
 Hey, I'm Just Like You (2019)
 Crybaby (2022)

Awards and nominations
Tegan and Sara were honored with the Governor General's Performing Arts Award, 2018.

Bibliography
 High School (2019)

See also

 List of Canadian bands

References

External links

 
 

1980 births
1995 establishments in Alberta
All-female bands
Canadian indie pop groups
Canadian indie rock groups
Canadian musical duos
Identical twin females
Canadian lesbian musicians
LGBT-themed musical groups
Canadian LGBT singers
Canadian LGBT songwriters
Musical groups established in 1995
Musical groups from Calgary
Musical groups from Montreal
Sire Records artists
Twin musical duos
Canadian twins
Living people
Female musical duos
Lesbian singers
Lesbian songwriters
Juno Award for Single of the Year winners
20th-century Canadian women singers
Juno Award for Group of the Year winners
Juno Award for Pop Album of the Year winners
21st-century Canadian women singers
Sanctuary Records artists
Feminist musicians
 
21st-century Canadian LGBT people
20th-century Canadian LGBT people